This article contains information about the literary events and publications of 1725.

Events
June 12 – Émilie de Breteuil marries Marquis Florent-Claude du Chastellet.
December – The library of Charles Killigrew, who was the Master of the Revels for 48 years, is sold a few months after his death.
In China, 66 copies of a 5,020-volume encyclopedia, the Gujin Tushu Jicheng (Complete Collection of Illustrations and Writings from the Earliest to Current Times) are printed, which requires the crafting of 250,000 movable-type characters cast in bronze.

New books

Prose
Joseph Addison – Miscellanies
The Book of the Sacred Magic of Abramelin the Mage (first printed edition)
Mary Davys – The Works of Mrs. Davys
Daniel Defoe – The Complete English Tradesman
George Bubb Dodington – An Epistle to Sir Robert Walpole
John Dyer – A New Miscellany
Laurence Echard – The History of the Revelation
Benjamin Franklin – A Dissertation on Liberty and Necessity, Pleasure and Pain
Johann Joseph Fux – Gradus ad Parnassum (Steps to Mount Parnassus, in Latin)
Zachary Grey – A Defence of Our Antient and Modern Historians (against John Oldmixon)
Eliza Haywood
Bath-Intrigues
Fantomina
Memoirs of a Certain Island Adjacent to the Kingdom of Utopia
Secret Histories, Novels and Poems
Francis Hutcheson – An Inquiry into the Original of Our Ideas of Beauty and Virtue (on aesthetics)
John Oldmixon – A Review of Dr. Zachary Grey's Defence
Richardson Pack – A New Collection of Miscellanies
Christopher Pitt – Vida's Art of Poetry (translation of Marco Girolamo Vida)
Richard Savage – The Authors of the Town
William Shakespeare – The Works of Shakespear (edited by Pope)
Jonathan Swift – Fraud Detected; or, The Hibernian Patriot
Giambattista Vico – New Science
Isaac Watts – Logick
George Whitehead – The Christian Progress of George Whitehead
Edward Young – The Universal Passion: Satire
Benito Jerónimo Feijoo – Aprobación apologetica del scepticismo médico del doctor Martín Martínez
Diego de Torres Villarroel – Correo del otro mundo al gran Piscator de Salamanca

Drama
Colley Cibber – Caesar in Aegypt
Augustin Nadal – Mariamne
Gabriel Odingsells – 
 The Bath Unmasked
 The Capricious Lovers
Thomas Sheridan – The Philoctetes of Sophocles

Poetry

Henry Baker – Original Poems
Henry Carey – Namby Pamby (satire on Ambrose Philips)
Thomas Cooke – The Battle of the Poets (satire on Alexander Pope)
John Glanvill – Poems
Alexander Pope – The Odyssey of Homer vols. i–iii
Allan Ramsay – The Gentle Shepherd

Births
February 5 – Anna Maria Rückerschöld, Swedish author (died 1805)
February 12 – William Mason, English poet and gardener (died 1797)
March 22 – Ignacy Nagurczewski, Polish writer and translator (died 1811)
April 2 – Giacomo Casanova, Italian autobiographer and adventurer (died 1798)
July 24 – John Newton, English hymnist, naval officer and cleric (died 1807)
December 5 – Susanna Duncombe, English poet and artist (died 1812)

Deaths
January 6 – Chikamatsu Monzaemon (近松 門左衛門), Japanese dramatist (born 1653)
January 26 – Sulkhan-Saba Orbeliani, Georgian prince and writer (born 1658)
February 8 – John Bellers, English writer and Quaker (born 1654)
March 2 – Johan Peringskiöld, Swedish antiquary and translator (born 1689)
April 25 – Paul de Rapin, French historian (born 1661)
June 29 – Arai Hakuseki, Japanese scholar-bureaucrat and writer (born 1657)
September 5 – Christian Wernicke, German epigrammist (born 1661)
December 7 – Florent Carton Dancourt, French dramatist and actor (born 1661)
Unknown date – Richard Fiddes, English historian and cleric (born 1671)

References

 
Years of the 18th century in literature